Stuart Airey (born 4 October 1971) is an English international lawn bowler.

Bowls career
In 1997 & 1998, he won the Hong Kong International Bowls Classic pairs titles with Andrew Wills.

In 2009 he won the triples and fours silver medals at the Atlantic Bowls Championships.
He competed for England in the 2010 Commonwealth Games Men's pairs winning a silver medal with Mervyn King and four years later he won another silver medal in the men's fours at the 2014 Commonwealth Games.

References

1971 births
Living people
Bowls players at the 2010 Commonwealth Games
Bowls players at the 2014 Commonwealth Games
Commonwealth Games silver medallists for England
English male bowls players
Commonwealth Games medallists in lawn bowls
Medallists at the 2010 Commonwealth Games